Schaan is the largest municipality of Liechtenstein by population. It is located to the north of Vaduz, the capital, in the central part of the country.  it has a population of 6,039 making it the most populous administrative district in Liechtenstein. It is a municipality within the electoral district of Oberland in the Principality of Liechtenstein. Schaan contains four enclaves: Brunnenegg, Gritsch, Guschg, and Plankner Neugrütt.

History

Recent archaeological finds have shown that Schaan has been inhabited for over 6000 years: In the year 15 BC, The Romans, under Augustus, conquered the territory of the present Principality of Liechtenstein and established the Roman province of Raetia. In the 1st century AD, a military road was built from Milan to Bregenz, running along the Luzisteig on the right bank of the Rhine. This led to the building of settlements in modern-day Schaan. Two Roman legionnaire's helmets were found in 1887 during digging work buried above Dux and bearing the engraved names of the legionaries Publius Cavidius Felix and Numerius Pomponius. Dated to the 1st century AD, it is likely that they were intended as a variety of commemoration of the two men. They are now housed in the museums of Bregenz and Zurich. 

The most important Roman building on the territory of the municipality is a fort built in the valley, whose purpose was to afford protect against the ever more frequent Alemannic invasions. Remains of its foundations and the gate tower are again visible from St. Peter's Church, Schaan. A 5th century baptistery was found during excavations inside this church, suggesting early Christianization. During excavations, there traces of a prehistoric settlement were also found.

The Alemannic settlement is evidenced by numerous grave finds. At that time Schaan consisted of two separate parts. The Romanized Räter-people had their centre at St. Peter, while the Alemannic population settled in the area of Specki. This dichotomy can still be seen today in the existence of two alpine cooperatives, the North-Alemannic cooperative Gritsch and the southern Rhaeto-Romanian cooperative Guschg.

Geography
Schaan is the northernmost municipality in the Liechtenstein Oberland. It is bordered to the south by the capital, Vaduz, to the east by Planken and Triesenberg, and to the north by the municipalities of Eschen and Gamprin. In the west, the Rhine forms the natural border with Switzerland, and in the east, the town is dominated by the Three Sisters mountain range. Schaan also has four exclaves within other municipalities, and two enclaves within its primary municipality. Because of this, Schaan borders Austria in three separate locations.

Transport

Schaan-Vaduz railway station
Schaan-Vaduz is one of the four train stations serving Liechtenstein, located in the town of Schaan, 3.5 km from Vaduz. It is owned by the Austrian Federal Railways (ÖBB). The station is served by eighteen trains per day, nine in each direction between Switzerland and Austria. It is situated on the international and electrified Feldkirch-Buchs line, between the station of Buchs SG (in Switzerland) and the stop of Forst Hilti (in the northern suburb of Schaan). It is served only by regional trains.

Schaan Forst Hilti railway station
The station is served by eighteen trains per day, nine in each direction between Switzerland and Austria. It is located in front of the Hilti Corporation's headquarters, on the outskirts of Schaan.

Climate
Schaan has an Oceanic climate (Koppen: Cfb)

Education
There are four kindergarten sites: Malarsch, Pardiel, Rebera, and Werkof. The Gemeinschaftszentrum Resch, Primarschule provides primary education.

Realschule Schaan and Sportschule Liechtenstein are in Schaan, while Realschule Vaduz and Oberschule Vaduz are in the Schulzentrum Mühleholz II in Vaduz. Liechtensteinisches Gymnasium is also in Vaduz.

There is a private Waldorf school which has students from, in addition to Liechtenstein, Austria and Switzerland. It was established in 1985.

Notable people 
 Maria von Linden (1869–1936 in Schaan) a German bacteriologist and zoologist
 Gerta Keller (born 1945 in Schaan) Professor of Paleontology and Geology at Princeton University since 1984.
 Roman Hermann (born 1953 in Schaan) a Liechtensteiner former cyclist
 Paul Frommelt (born 1957 in Schaan) a former Alpine skier
 Peter Jehle (born 1982 in Schaan) footballer who plays for Liechtenstein club FC Vaduz as a goalkeeper
 Ivan Quintans (born 1989 in Schaan) a Liechtensteiner footballer

Gallery

References

External links

 
Municipalities of Liechtenstein
Liechtenstein–Switzerland border crossings